Redcar railway station may refer to:

 Redcar Central railway station
 Redcar East railway station
 British Steel Redcar railway station